The Girl with the Whip (French: La fille au fouet) is a 1952 Swiss drama film directed by Jean Dréville and starring Michel Simon, Gaby Morlay and Colette Darfeuil.

The film's sets were designed by the art director Robert Dumesnil. It was shot at the Boulogne Studios in Paris. A separate German version, The Secret of the Mountain Lake, was also made.

Cast
 Michel Simon as Le tuteur d'Angelina 
 Gaby Morlay as Lamberta 
 Colette Darfeuil as Lorenza 
 Pauline Carton as La bonne 
 Véronique Deschamps as Angelina / Pietro 
 Marcelle Géniat as Madame Pons
 Lydie Lord
 Claire Gérard as La femme de Borgo 
 Roger Burkart
 Andrews Engelmann as Le directeur de la prison 
 Mariette Ellys
 Rudy Lenoir
 Abel Barthelemo as L'accordéoniste 
 Philippe Derevel as Le ténor 
 Howard Vernon as Borgo 
 Michel Barbey as Calixe

References

Bibliography
 Rège, Philippe. Encyclopedia of French Film Directors, Volume 1. Scarecrow Press, 2009.

External links 
 

1952 films
1952 drama films
Swiss drama films
1950s French-language films
Swiss black-and-white films
Films directed by Jean Dréville
Cross-dressing in film
Films set in the Alps
French multilingual films
Films shot at Boulogne Studios
1950s multilingual films